Club Ferro Carril Oeste, known simply as Ferro Carril Oeste or familiarly, Ferro, is an Argentine sports club from the neighbourhood of Caballito, Buenos Aires. Although many activities are hosted by the club, Ferro is mostly known for its football team, which plays in the Primera Nacional, the second division of the Argentine football league system.

Apart from football, Ferro Carril Oeste hosts a wide variety of sports that can be practised at the club, such as athletics, basketball, baseball, futsal, handball, field hockey, swimming, taekwondo, tennis, table tennis, volleyball. and, since 2001, professional boxing shows, including world championship boxing contests.

As its name indicates, the club had railway origins, being founded in 1904 by employees of the Buenos Aires Western Railway. The club had its glory days in the 1980s, having won numerous titles in several sports disciplines, being also recognised by Unesco as a model institution. Ferro Carril Oeste had 50,000 members by those years.

History

The beginning

Always located in Caballito, the club was founded as "Club Atlético del Ferrocarril Oeste de Buenos Aires" on 28 July 1904, by a hundred employees of the Buenos Aires Western Railway (then Ferrocarril Domingo Faustino Sarmiento). The club was approved and supported by railway managers, so Ferro soon incorporated lands to build its headquarters and sports installations. In 1905 the club built its own stadium, Estadio Arquitecto Ricardo Etcheverry, financed by its main founding member, David Simpson. Ferro affiliated to the Argentine Football Association to register a team to play in the third division.

The first official match was played on 21 April 1907 v River Plate. In 1912, Ferro won the División Intermedia (then, the second division) title and promoted to Primera División. That same year the club won the Copa Bullrich title. Ferro C. Oeste would win another Copa Bullrich title the following year, but playing with reserve teams.

Ferro debuted in the top division in 1913 v Riachuelo (1–1 draw). By those years, the club also inaugurated running tracks, bocce, tennis courts, basque pelota courts but also closed the cricket section in 1914.

The Five Musketeers
At the end of the 1930s, the club emancipated from the railway company, changing its name to "Club Ferro Carril Oeste". In 1937 five talented players rose from the youth divisions, forming an offensive line which would be remembered as The Five Musketeers. They were Bernardo Gandulla, Juan José Maril, Luis Borgnia, Jaime Sarlanga and Raúl Emeal. But those skilled players only played together between 1937 and 1938, due to other clubs acquiring them (Sarlanga would have a memorable run with Boca Juniors). Both Gandulla and Sarlanga together scored more than the 50% of the goals scored by Ferro in the 1937 season.

Other notable player for the club was Delfín Benítez Cáceres, who played from 1941 until his retirement in 1944 scoring 20 goals. Gandulla and Emeal returned to Ferro in 1944 after their stint with Boca Juniors. But despite having such prominent players, Ferro finished last in 1946 and was relegated to Primera B for the first time in its history.

Apart from football, the club added several sections to its range of sports disciplines, such as swimming, water polo, and chess (starting after the club affiliated to Argentine Chess Federation). In 1933, Ferro C.O. formed its first basketball team. In the 1940s, Ferro also added fencing and roller skating. As a result, the club increased its number of members, with more than 6,000 by 1941.

1950–1970 

Ferro soon returned to the first division in 1949, when winning the Primera B title. Being presided by Atilio Renzi (a politician affiliated to Justicialist Party and private secretary of Eva Perón), the club added volleyball to its list of sports. The football team stayed in Primera until 1957, when its poor permformance during that championship caused Ferro C.O. was relegated for the second time in its history. Ferro only lasted one year in Primera B, returning in 1958 when the squad crowned champion. Ferro totalised 50 points in 34 matches played, followed by Nueva Chicago with 46.

In the 1959 Primera División, Ferro finished 4th, being the best position in the top division until then. After being relegated again, Ferro won the Primera B championship in 1963, returning to Primera División. In the top level, Ferro reached another 4th place in the 1965 tournament. Ferro would be relegated again in 1968 after playing a "Reclasificatorio" tournament. In the 1969 Primera B season, Ferro C.O. won the tournament (with San Telmo as runner up) but none of them could promote to Primera after they lost in the Reclasificatorio tournament to Banfield and Deportivo Morón (the worst placed teams in 1969 Metropolitano).

Following with the good performance in 1969 season, Ferro C.O. won its second consecutive Primera B title in 1970, directly promoting to Primera División to play the 1971 season. By 1972, the club had 17,299 members and inaugurated the Gimnasio Héctor Etchart, home venue for the basketball team. In 1974 Ferro wore an orange jersey, paying tribute to World sub-champion Netherlands national football team, The Clockwork Orange, finishing 6th in the Torneo Nacional disputed that year. Gerónimo Saccardi was one of the most notable players for the club during those years. After some irregular campaigns, Ferro finished 23rd (last) in 1977, being relegated along with Lanús and Temperley.

Ferro C. Oeste quickly returning to Primera so the team won the Primera B championship in 1978.

The Golden Age: 1980s
Ferro had a prominent role in Argentine sports in the 1980s, more specifically in football and basketball. The football team won 2 titles of Argentine Primera División and played the Copa Libertadores. Otherwise, the basketball team won the Liga Nacional de Básquet (the Argentine first division league) championship 3 times.

In 1979 Carlos Griguol was hired as club manager. He would become the most successful coach in the club's history, winning 2 Primera División titles for the first time and also promoting players such as Alberto Márcico, Héctor Cúper and Oscar Garré. In the 1981 Metropolitano championship Ferro finished 2nd, totalling 49 points, just one less than champion Boca Juniors. In that season, goalkeeper Carlos Barisio set a national record by keeping his goal unbeaten for 1,075 minutes. This included a run of 10 complete games without conceding a goal. That same year Ferro reached the Torneo Nacional final although the team was defeated by River Plate (by the same score: 1–0 in the two matches played).

Ferro finally won its first title at Primera in 1982, winning the Nacional tournament after beating defending champions Quilmes in the finals (0–0, 2–0). The squad played a total of 22 matches, winning 16 with 6 draws so they won the championship remaining unbeaten. Ferro scored 50 goals and conceded 13. Left wing Miguel Angel Juárez was the top scorer with 22 goals. Other notable players for the champion team were Adolfino Cañete, Alberto Márcico, Juan Domingo Rocchia, and Héctor Cúper.

Although some key players during the 1982 tournament (Saccardi, Rocchia, Crocco) had left the club, Ferro won another Torneo Nacional in 1984, defeating River Plate (with Norberto Alonso and Enzo Francescoli) winning the two finals (3–0 and 1–0). The team played 14 matches, winning 8 and losing only 1, with 5 draws. Ferro scored 32 goals and only conceded 9, with Márcico being the top scorer with 5 goals. As one of the Argentine champions, Ferro debuted in Copa Libertadores playing the 1983 edition in a group with Estudiantes LP, and Chilean teams Colo Colo and Cobreloa, being eliminated after finishing last.

The good performances by the squad in local football followed in the 1984 Metropolitano, where Ferro C.O. finished 2nd. (50 pts) after Argentinos Juniors (51 pts). Ferro returned to international competitions to play the 1985 Copa Libertadores, being eliminated in the first stage.

During the 1980s, Ferro gained recognition not only in football but also in basketball, being the first winner of the recently created Liga Nacional in 1985 after beating Atenas 2–1 in the finals. Santiago Leyden was the president between 1964 and 1993. He is regarded as the man who led the club to a decade of greatness that included more than 100 titles in several sports disciplines. Leyden was also vicepresident of CONMEBOL between 1976 and 1980. Also in the 1980s. Ferro Carril Oeste reached its peak as sports and social club, with more than 50,000 members and was proclaimed as a "model institution" by Unesco.

In 1987 Carlos Griguol left the club, and was hired by River Plate. He had won 2 titles in the first division (who still are the only two championships won by Ferro at the top level of Argentine football) and 2 sub-championships. Griguol returned in 1988, coaching Ferro until 1993.

Decline
On the other hand, Ferro had the longest run without scoring a goal. The team went 875 minutes without scoring between the end of the 1998 Apertura and the 1999 Clausura.

In 1990's Ferro's form gradually declined and relegated to third level in 2001 after two consecutive relegations. Ferro finally returned to second one in 2003.

Ferro has a strong rivalry with Vélez Sársfield, so both teams disputed what is known as Clásico del Oeste.

Kit uniform evolution

Main uniform

Special editions

Notes

Players

Current squad

Out on loan

Notable former players 

  Bernardo Gandulla (1934–39)
  Jaime Sarlanga (1937–39)
  Delfín Benítez Cáceres (1941–44)
  Vicente Gambardella (1960)
  Gerónimo Saccardi (1969–75, 1979–83)
  Juan Domingo Rocchia (1973–83)
  Oscar Garré (1974–88)
  Héctor Cúper (1976–77, 1978–88)
  Carlos Barisio (1978–83)
  Alberto Márcico (1980–85)
  Adolfino Cañete (1980–84)
  Carlos Moya

Managers

 Mario Fortunato (1937), (1953)
 Pedro Dellacha (1965)
 Victorio Spinetto (1973–76)
 Carlos Griguol (1979–87), (1988–93)
 Gerónimo Saccardi (1997–99)
 Rubén Darío Insúa (1999)
 Héctor Rivoira (2004–05)
 José Luis Brown (2007–08)
 Carlos Trullet (2008–09)
 Jorge Luis Ghiso (2009)
 Dalcio Giovagnoli (2010)
 Mario Gómez (2011–12)
 José Luis Brown (2013)
 José Romero (2014)
 Marcelo Broggi (2015)
 Walter Perazzo (2016)
 Marcelo Broggi (2017–18)
 Alejandro Orfila (2018)
 Jorge Cordon (2018–20)
 Diego Osella (2020-)

Other sports

Basketball

Ferro Carril Oeste was one of the most successful basketball clubs in Argentina during the 1980s, being the first champion of Liga Nacional de Básquet in 1985. The club has won a total of three LNB and one Campeonato Argentino title.

At international level, Ferro won three South American Championship titles (being also the first Argentine team to win that competition). Ferro remains (along with Boca Juniors) as the most winning Argentine team.

Honours

Football
Primera División (2): 1982 Nacional, 1984 Nacional
Primera B (7): 1913, 1958, 1963, 1969, 1970, 1978, 2002–03
División Intermedia (1): 1912
Copa Bullrich (2): 1912, 1913

Volleyball
Men
Primera División (6): 1977, 1980, 1981, 1983, 1984, 1985
Copa Morgan (7): 1966, 1977, 1977, 1983, 1984, 1985, 1986
Campeonato Sudamericano (2): 1987, 1998
Women
Primera División (8): 1979, 1980, 1981, 1982, 1983, 1984, 1985, 1990
Copa Morgan (11): 1977, 1978, 1980, 1981, 1983, 1984, 1986, 1987, 1988, 1998, 2004

Notes

References

External links

 
 Ferro C. Oeste (unofficial) 
 Ferropedia
 Ferroweb

 
Association football clubs established in 1904
Basketball teams established in 1904
f
Argentine volleyball teams
Railway sports teams
1904 establishments in Argentina
Football clubs in Buenos Aires
Railway association football teams